Michael Cornelis Woud (born 16 January 1999) is a New Zealand professional footballer who plays as a goalkeeper for J.League club Kyoto Sanga and the New Zealand national football team.

Club career

Sunderland
Woud first signed a contract to play for Sunderland, but only played for their academy teams. After the contract termination of fellow goalkeeper Mika, Woud acted for a short time as third-choice goalkeeper at the club; following Sunderland's relegation to League One, Woud was one of four goalkeepers training with the first team.

Willem II
On 14 July 2018, with a year remaining on his Sunderland contract, Woud signed a two-year deal with Willem II in the Eredivisie for an undisclosed fee.

Woud made his professional debut on 30 March 2019, in a 3–2 win against Fortuna Sittard.

On 1 July 2020, Woud moved to Eerste Divisie club, Almere City, on a 1-year loan. On 26 January 2021, the loan was made permanent, with Woud signing a deal until June 2024.

Kyoto Sanga
On 4 January 2022, Woud signed with Kyoto Sanga in Japan.

International career
Woud competed for New Zealand in both the 2015 FIFA U-17 World Cup and the 2017 FIFA U-20 World Cup, starring in the latter, but being knocked out in the round of 16 on both occasions. He received his first callup to the New Zealand senior team for a friendly against Japan in October 2017, and made his first appearance in the 2018 Intercontinental Cup in a 2–1 win over India.

Woud remains eligible for both New Zealand and the Netherlands. In August 2018, Woud was called up to the Netherlands under-20 national team for a friendly against Portugal; however, he rejected this offer in order to further his national career with New Zealand.

Woud played for the New Zealand under-20 football team in the 2019 FIFA U-20 World Cup. In the round of 16 following a 1–1 draw with Colombia after extra time, Woud made 3 straight saves in the penalty shootout. However, following the third save, the referee ruled that he moved off his line too early and ordered a retake. Colombia went on to win the penalty shootout and advance to the next round.

Woud was called up to play for the New Zealand under-23 football team at the 2020 Summer Olympics in Tokyo. Playing in all three pool games, Woud helped the team pickup their first win at the Olympics as well as qualify for the first time to the knockout stage.

Honours 

New Zealand U17
 OFC U-17 Championship: 2015

New Zealand U20
 OFC U-20 Championship: 2016

Individual

 Golden Gloves: 2016 OFC U-20 Championship

References

External links
 
 
 
 Michael Woud's profile on Sunderland website.

1999 births
New Zealand people of Dutch descent
Living people
New Zealand association footballers
New Zealand international footballers
New Zealand youth international footballers
Association football goalkeepers
Willem II (football club) players
Almere City FC players
Kyoto Sanga FC players
Eredivisie players
Eerste Divisie players
Footballers at the 2020 Summer Olympics
Olympic association footballers of New Zealand
New Zealand expatriate association footballers
Expatriate footballers in England
New Zealand expatriate sportspeople in England
Expatriate footballers in the Netherlands
New Zealand expatriate sportspeople in the Netherlands
Expatriate footballers in Japan
New Zealand expatriate sportspeople in Japan
New Zealand under-20 international footballers